The N-124 is a short road in northern Spain which connects Ollauri, La Rioja with Armiñón, Álava. The Zambrana bypass was upgraded to autovía standards in 2019, while works to upgrade the section from Zambrana to Armiñón started in 2022.

The southern end of the road is at a junction with the N-232 road near Ollauri. It heads north parallel to the Ebro river, bypassing Haro, Briñas and Zambrana. The road ends at a junction with the A-1 motorway in Armiñón, close to Miranda de Ebro.

References

N-124
N-124
Roads in the Basque Country (autonomous community)
Transport in La Rioja (Spain)